Fussman, Fußmann is a German surname. Notable people with the surname include:

Cal Fussman, is a New York Times bestselling author, longtime Esquire writer, corporate consultant and host of the Big Questions podcast.
Gérard Fussman (born 1940), French Indologist
Klaus Fußmann (born 1938), German painter

German-language surnames